Family Time With Kapil Sharma is an Indian Hindi stand-up comedy and game show which premiered on 25 March 2018 for a total of 3 episodes. The show was broadcast on Sony TV. Neha Pendse was the co-host of this show while Kiku Sharda and Chandan Prabhakar appeared at regular intervals to crack jokes and participate in the games that are being played. Family members selected from all over India participate in the show and play games to win prizes. The show was taken off-air (first for the entire month of April, 2018, then permanently) because of cancelled filming. Kapil Sharma had said in an interview that the show will resume later after this hiatus, however that never happened.

Cast
Kapil Sharma as Himself, Host
Neha Pendse as Herself, Host
Kiku Sharda as Bumper
Chandan Prabhakar as Chandan
Navjot Singh Sidhu as Permanent Guest

List of episodes

References

Indian television sketch shows
2018 Indian television series debuts
Hindi-language television shows
Frames Production series
Sony Entertainment Television original programming
Indian game shows
2018 Indian television series endings